Prince Henry's High School, formerly Prince Henry's Grammar School is an upper school with academy status in Evesham, Worcestershire, England. It is a co-educational high school, in which there are about 1,280 students enrolled, aged between 13 and 18. It is situated in the north of Evesham off the A4184, near the junction with the B4624, adjacent to the north of the railway, and serves the town of Evesham and surrounding villages. A 2013 Ofsted report accorded the school a Grade 1 (outstanding)

History
The school is over 600 years old  and was originally established as a school for the poor that was attached to Evesham's Benedictine Abbey. The original school was located by the side of what is now the road from Merstow Green to the High Street in Evesham. The present site of the school was established in the late 19th century and is about one kilometre approximately north-north-east of the original site. The school is named after Prince Henry, the elder brother of King Charles I: Prince Henry died at the age of 18 years and predeceased his father, thus never becoming king. Dr Lewis Bayley had previously taught at and secured an endowment for the school from the town of Evesham through a new town charter, which identifies the school as a "Free Grammar School of Prince Henry in Evesham". As Prince Henry's Grammar School, the school had around 500 boys and girls. In the 1960s as a Grammar School before the establishment of the Middle Schools in the area, entry was directly from Primary School usually at age 11 yet sometimes, for a few pupils, at age 10, pupils being from Primary Schools both in Evesham itself, and also surrounding villages up to around ten miles away, and the nearby town of Pershore.

In 1973 it was renamed Prince Henry's High School, a comprehensive school. In 1993 it became a grant-maintained school then in 1999 it became a foundation school. It is now a secondary school with  the specialist designation of Language College. In 2010, plans were announced to change the school into an academy in  a move to improve funding, and provide more opportunities for the pupils in the school.

The crest of the school includes a modern continuing use of the coat of arms of Evesham Abbey. Evesham Abbey was dissolved in the sixteenth century.

The House System
When students join the school, they become a member of one of the five houses. In the days of the Grammar School new pupils were asked if any of their family were (previously or currently) at the school and if so, in which house. Where there was such a link, from, for example from a parent or a sibling, the new pupil was enrolled in that house. Those pupils who were not so linked were allocated to a house. These are, Burlingham, Deacle, Holland, Lichfield and Workman. House Points are awarded for good work and attitude to learning in the classroom.  They can also be awarded to a student who is going ‘above and beyond’ in an area of school life. Houses compete in different activities such as cooking, sport, music and board games.

Burlingham House
Richard Burlingham was educated at Prince Henry's Grammar School and started his career as a soldier, becoming an officer in the Worcestershire Regiment as a young man in the 1930s.  During the Second World War he worked for the Deputy Quartermaster General organising supplies for the troops and reached the rank of Lieutenant Colonel by the end of the war.

Lieutenant Colonel Burlingham was a governor of Prince Henry's High School for almost 50 years from 1949 until the late 1990s.  From 1963 he was the Chair of Governors for 25 years finally stepping down from the governing body in 1997/1998.  He also served on both Evesham Council and the County Council, becoming Chair of each.  He became an Alderman of Evesham and was later appointed Deputy Lord Lieutenant of the County.

Deacle House
John Deacle was born on 10 June 1660 in Bengeworth. He made his fortune in the woollen trade and became an Alderman of London. On his death in September 1709, John Deacle’s will left provision for £2,000 to be spent on building a charity school, with a further £300 per year for the ongoing running of that school. The new school, which became known as Deacle Charity Free School, was to offer 30 boys from the poorest of backgrounds of the parish the chance of an education, the right to which was normally only for the privileged few at this time.

The Deacle School was built in Port Street in 1729 and was only closed in 1905. The old school building still stands, and although it now has shop fronts obstructing the view, it can be found on the right-hand side as you head up Port Street from the Workman Bridge.

In 1906 the Deacle Charity Free School and Prince Henry's Grammar School merged under the control of Worcestershire County Council, and the Deacle School pupils joined the Prince Henry's students at Lanesfield on Greenhill.

Holland House
Revd Holland was a key figure in saving the school by working hard to raise funds as well as using his own money.  In 1879 Prince Henry's Grammar School was moved from Merstow Green to Lanesfield on Greenhill.

Lanesfield remained the location of the school until 1910, when the recently merged Prince Henry's Grammar School and Deacle School moved into new buildings at the school's current site on Victoria Avenue.

Lichfield House
Clement Lichfield became what was to be the last Abbot of Evesham Abbey in 1514. He was responsible for the final building works undertaken on the Abbey complex prior to its dissolution by Henry VIII, including the St Clements Chantry, off All Saints church. He also built a new school building in Merstow Green. The fact that the school was sited away from the main Abbey saved it when the majority of the complex was dismantled in 1540.

That school building (which continued in use as a school until 1879), together with the Bell Tower and Chantry Chapel (now known as the Lichfield Chapel) are the main significant surviving structures from Evesham Abbey which, at its peak, was the third largest Abbey Church in England.

Workman House
Henry Workman was Mayor of Evesham from 1851 to 1855 and built the Workman Bridge in 1856. The river below the site of the bridge was a maze of shallows and treacherous currents, so Henry Workman had it dredged into one channel and used the sediment from the river to create the Workman Gardens and public park.

He financially contributed to the school move from Merstow Green to its new site on Greenhill, which took place in 1879.

National Teaching School Status
In April 2014, Prince Henry's High School was selected by the National College for Teaching and Leadership (NCTL) to become a national teaching school – an important role in raising standards.
Teaching Schools take a leading role in recruiting and training new entrants to the profession, identifying leadership potential and providing support for other schools.  
Prince Henry's High School was one of only 200 schools in England to be granted teaching school status in the latest designation round.

Alumni

Prince Henry's High School

Alex Gregory MBE, Team GB Rower and Olympic Gold Medallist. Left the sixth form in 2002.
Daryl Mitchell, Cricketer
Arthur Williams, TV Presenter

Prince Henry's Grammar School

 Les Huckfield, former Labour MP for Nuneaton and MEP for Merseyside East
 Nigel Jones, Baron Jones of Cheltenham (1948–2022), Lib Dem MP 1992-2005 for Cheltenham
 William Valentine Mayneord CBE FRS (1902–88), radiologist, President of the British Institute of Radiology in 1942-43 and of the International Organization for Medical Physics 1965-69 
 Mark Beech, writer and rock critic
 Sir Henry Fowler (engineer) (29 July 1870 – 16 October 1938) was a chief mechanical engineer of the Midland Railway and subsequently the London, Midland and Scottish Railway.

Former teachers
 Peter Reynolds, archaeologist (taught Classics).

References

External links
 DfE GIAS

Academies in Worcestershire
Educational institutions established in the 14th century
1376 establishments in England
Evesham
Upper schools in Worcestershire